The Missioner is a 1922 British silent crime film directed by George Ridgwell and starring Cyril Percival, Pauline Peters and Olaf Hytten.

Cast
 Cyril Percival as Victor Manderson  
 Pauline Peters as Wilhelmina Thorpe-Hatton  
 Olaf Hytten as Stephen Hurd  
 Lewis Gilbert as Jean de Roi  
 Allan Jeayes as Gilbert Deyes  
 Alice Ridgwell as Letty Fulton

References

Bibliography
 Goble, Alan. The Complete Index to Literary Sources in Film. Walter de Gruyter, 1999.

External links
 

1922 films
1922 crime films
British crime films
British silent feature films
1920s English-language films
Films directed by George Ridgwell
Films set in England
Stoll Pictures films
Films based on British novels
British black-and-white films
1920s British films